5. april '81 is the second live album by Yugoslav rock band Bijelo Dugme, released in 1981. It was recorded in Kulušić club in Zagreb on 5 April 1981. The album was put out in limited release of only 20,000 copies.

Background
The album was recorded on the last concert of the tour that followed the release of the album Doživjeti stotu. The band was announced by journalist Dražen Vrdoljak (the announcement being featured on the album). The album's sound was in correspondence with the shift from hard rock towards new wave the band made with Doživjeti stotu.

The album featured a cover of Indexi song "Sve ove godine" ("All These Years").

Album cover
The cover artwork depicted a three-picture presentation of a girl wearing an adult woman's robe and high heels. The girl photographed was daughter of actor Mladen Jeličić. Although the album cover saw no controversy in 1981, when 5. april '81 was re-released on CD by Croatia Records in 2003, the image was modified, leaving only the leftmost and rightmost photos, most likely because the girl's genital area is visible in the middle photo.

Track listing

Personnel
Željko Bebek – vocals
Goran Bregović – guitar, producer, mixed by
Zoran Redžić – bass
Điđi Jankelić – drums
Vlado Pravdić – keyboard

Additional personnel
Dražen Vrdoljak - introduction
Mladen Škalec - engineer
Hrvoje Hegedušić - engineer, mixed by

Legacy
In 1987, in YU legende uživo (YU Legends Live), a special publication by Rock magazine, 5. april '81 was pronounced one of 12 best Yugoslav live albums. In YU legende uživo, critic Petar Janjatović criticized the band's performance on the album, especially Željko Bebek's vocal performance, but also stated:

In a 2000 text for Vjesnik, critic Hrvoje Horvat stated:

References

External links 
 5. april '81 at Discogs

Bijelo Dugme live albums
1981 live albums
Jugoton live albums